The Dugi Archeological Site is a prehistoric latte stone site on the north side of Rota Island in the Northern Mariana Islands.  The site is a rare inland site that survived the intensive sugar cane development introduced by the Japanese during the South Seas Mandate period of the 1920s and 1930s.  It consists of sixteen deteriorated latte stone structures on three high terraces.  Some of the latte stones have fallen over and others are missing features normally found at these sites.

The site was listed on the National Register of Historic Places in 1985.

See also
National Register of Historic Places listings in the Northern Mariana Islands

References

Mariana Islands culture
Megalithic monuments
Rota (island)
Historic districts on the National Register of Historic Places in the Northern Mariana Islands
Historic districts in the Northern Mariana Islands
Archaeological sites in the Northern Mariana Islands
Archaeological sites on the National Register of Historic Places in the Northern Mariana Islands